Rhytidium is a genus of mosses belonging to the family Hylocomiaceae.

The genus has almost cosmopolitan distribution.

Species:
 Rhytidium rugosum Kindberg, 1883

References

Hypnales
Moss genera